This is a list of shipwrecks located in international waters.

Arctic Ocean

Barents Sea
{| class=wikitable | style = "width:100%"
! style="width:10%" | Ship
! style="width:10%" | Sunk date
! style="width:70%" | Notes
! style="width:10%" | Coordinates
|-
|HMS Achates
|31 December 1942
|An A-class destroyer that was sunk 135 nautical miles southeast of Bear Island, in the Battle of the Barents Sea.
|
|-
|RFA Aldersdale
|7 July 1942
|A Dale-class oil tanker that was damaged by aircraft and sunk by U-457.
|
|-
|HMS Bickerton
|22 August 1944
|A Buckley-class destroyer escort that was torpedoed by U-354 and scuttled.
|
|-
|HMS Edinburgh
|2 May 1942
|A Town-class light cruiser that was scuttled 400 kilometres northeast of Kola Bay, Russia.
|
|-
|SS Empire Byron
|5 July 1942
|A cargo ship that was torpedoed by U-703.
|
|-
|SS Empire Cowper
|11 April 1942
|A cargo ship that was bombed by German aircraft.
|
|-
|SS El Occidente
|13 April 1942
|A cargo ship that was torpedoed by U-435.
|
|-
|Z16 Friedrich Eckoldt
|31 December 1942
|
|-
|
|8–9 February 1974
|A British fishing vessel that disappeared without trace; the wreck was not discovered until 1997.
|
|-
|HMS Trinidad
|15 May 1942
|A Crown Colony-class cruiser that was attacked by German bombers and scuttled north of North Cape, Norway.
|
|-
|SM U-28
|2 September 1917
|A Type U 27 U-boat that attacked the SS Olive Branch at close range, 85 miles northeast of North Cape, Norway. The gunfire detonated the Olive Branch'''s cargo of munitions, and the U-boat was sunk in the resultant explosion.
|
|-
|U-288
|3 April 1944
|A Type VIIC U-boat that was sunk by British aircraft southeast of Bear Island.
|
|-
|U-314
|30 January 1944
|A Type VIIC U-boat that was sunk by HMS Whitehall and HMS Meteor southeast of Bear Island.
|
|-
|U-354
|24 August 1944
|A Type VIIC U-boat that was sunk by British ships northeast of North Cape.
|
|-
|U-425
|17 February 1945
|A Type VIIC U-boat that was sunk by HMS Lark and HMS Alnwick Castle near Murmansk, Russia.
|
|-
|U-457
|16 September 1942
|A Type VIIC U-boat that was sunk by HMS Impulsive northeast of Murmansk, Russia.
|
|-
|U-472
|4 March 1943
|A Type VIIC U-boat that was sunk by HMS Onslaught and British aircraft southeast of Bear Island.
|
|-
|U-585
|30 March 1942
|A Type VIIC U-boat that was sunk by a German mine north of Murmansk, Russia.
|
|-
|U-589
|14 September 1942
|A Type VIIC U-boat that was sunk by HMS Onslow and a British aircraft.
|
|-
|U-655
|24 March 1942
|A Type VIIC U-boat that was rammed by HMS Sharpshooter.
|
|}

Greenland Sea

Atlantic Ocean

Indian Ocean

Pacific Ocean

Southern Ocean

Further reading
 Jurisi, Mario, Ancient Shipwrecks of the Adriatic: maritime transport during the first and second centuries AD. (British archaeological reports: International series, 828) Oxford, Tempus Reparatum, 2000  
 Parker, A. J., Ancient Shipwrecks of the Mediterranean and the Roman provinces, (Oxford, 1992)
 Pickford, Nigel, Lost Treasure Ships of the Northern Seas: a guide and gazetteer to 2000 years of shipwreck'', (London: Chatham, 2006)

External links
 WRECKSITE Worldwide free database of + 65,000 wrecks with history, maritime charts and GPS positions

International waters